The Book of Kells is an illuminated manuscript Gospel book, created by Celtic monks c. 800 AD.

The Book of Kells may also refer to:

The Book of Kells (album), by Iona, 1992 
The Book of Kells (audio drama), a 2010 Doctor Who audio drama
The Book of Kells, a 1985 fantasy novel by R. A. MacAvoy

See also
The Secret of Kells, a 2009 animated movie about the Book of Kells
 Kells (disambiguation)